Gustafson's Farm is a brand name of milk and dairy products sold in the U.S. state of Florida. The main Gustafson Dairy Farm is located in Green Cove Springs, Florida, and was one of the largest privately owned dairy farms in the Southeast United States. Started in 1908, the main farm occupies nearly 10,000 acres (40 km²) in Green Cove Springs.  Their first cow on their farm was named "Buttercup".

The Gustafson brand is now owned by Southeast Milk Inc., a dairy cooperative based in Belleview, Florida. The production plant in Green Cove Springs, Florida closed in October, 2013, but Gustafson labeled products are still produced at the Southeast Milk Inc. facility and distributed in Florida. All Gustafson products have the picture of the husband-and-wife founders, Frank and Agnes Gustafson, (also known as Mama and Papa Gus) prominently featured on its packaging. Gustafson's main competitors are Dean Foods (owner of Florida-based T. G. Lee and MacArthur Dairy) and Borden Dairy.

See also
 List of dairy product companies in the United States

External links
Gustafson's Farm website
 Gustafson Dairy Farm Closing News Article

Dairy products companies of the United States
1908 establishments in Florida
Farms in Florida
Clay County, Florida